Cedric Manuel Mack (born September 14, 1960) is a former American football cornerback in the National Football League (NFL) for the St. Louis/Phoenix Cardinals, San Diego Chargers, Kansas City Chiefs, and the New Orleans Saints.  He played football at Brazosport High School and later at Baylor University.

Mack is currently a high school coach and math teacher at J. F. Dobie High School in Houston, Texas.

References

1960 births
Living people
People from Freeport, Texas
American football cornerbacks
Baylor Bears football players
St. Louis Cardinals (football) players
Phoenix Cardinals players
San Diego Chargers players
Kansas City Chiefs players
New Orleans Saints players